Lovell is a census-designated place (CDP) in Logan County, Oklahoma, United States. It was first determined by the United States Census Bureau prior to the 2020 census. It is named after the village of Lovell, which is incorporated in its boundaries.

Demographics

References 

Census-designated places in Logan County, Oklahoma
Census-designated places in Oklahoma